Tuxera Inc. (natively Tuxera Oy) is a Finnish company that develops and sells file systems, flash management and networking software. The company was founded in 2008 and is headquartered in Espoo, Finland. Tuxera's other offices are located in the US, South Korea, Japan, Hungary, Germany, Taiwan and China.

The company focuses on data management software for embedded systems: industry-standard file system technologies (APFS, exFAT, FAT, HFS+, NTFS), other embedded proprietary file systems, flash translation layer software, and networking stacks. Tuxera has network file systems that support enterprise storage use cases as well.

History 
The origin of the company dates back to the open-source NTFS development in the late 1990s. NTFS had been introduced in 1993 by Microsoft as the file system for Windows NT. At that time Anton Altaparmakov emerged as the lead developer and maintainer of the Linux NTFS kernel driver. Meanwhile, Szabolcs Szakacsits continued to lead a platform-independent project under the name NTFS-3G.  In 2006, NTFS-3G became the first driver to gain full read and write support. Commercial activity started in 2007 and the company was founded next year. In 2009 the company signed agreements with Microsoft, which was followed by global expansion and establishing collaboration with chipset vendors and software platform companies.

After several years of contributions to the Linux kernel, Tuxera joined the Linux Foundation in 2011. 

In 2019, the company became a board member of the SD Association. Tuxera also acquired Datalight that year, adding more file systems and flash management software to their offering. Later in 2021, Tuxera acquired HCC Embedded, adding more deeply embedded networking and storage software focused on real-time operating systems and micro-controllers.

Embedded products

Microsoft NTFS by Tuxera (formerly Tuxera NTFS) 
Tuxera NTFS is a performance optimized, fail-safe, fully compatible NTFS file system driver. It ships for example in smart TVs, set-top boxes, smartphones, tablets, routers, NAS and other devices. It is available for Android and other Linux platforms, QNX, WinCE Series 40, Nucleus RTOS and VxWorks. Supported architectures are ARM architecture, MIPS architecture, PowerPC, SuperH and x86.

Microsoft exFAT by Tuxera (formerly Tuxera exFAT) 
Tuxera exFAT technology is used for SDXC memory card support. Tuxera was the first independent vendor to receive legal access to exFAT and TexFAT specifications, source code and verification tools from Microsoft. Tuxera exFAT can be found in automotive infotainment systems, Android phones and tablets from ASUS, Fujitsu, Panasonic, Pantech and others.

Microsoft FAT by Tuxera (formerly Tuxera FAT) 
Tuxera FAT software provides interoperability and support for storage types such as SD memory card, CF card, Memory Stick, SSD, HDD via USB, SATA, eSATA, MMC and others. It is used by chipset and hardware manufacturers, and software and system integrators for full compliance with Microsoft patent licenses and GPL.

NTFS-3G

NTFS-3G is the original free-software "community edition" driver used widely in Linux distributions, including Fedora, Ubuntu, and others. On April 12, 2011 it was announced that Ntfsprogs project was merged with NTFS-3G.

Reliance Velocity (formerly VelocityFS by Tuxera and Tuxera Flash File System) 
Tuxera also develops and commercializes its own proprietary Flash file system. Due to its fail-safe technology it can be found for instance in vehicles and cars, integrated with the event data recorder to make sure the data recorded from sensors is consistent even in case of a crash.

Tuxera FAT+ 
In 2017, Tuxera introduced FAT+, a file system implementation for Universal Flash Storage cards and removable storage that is compatible with FAT32 but without the file size limitation of 4 GiB. It is royalty free for UFS card host devices and a standard recommended by the Universal Flash Storage Association.

Consumer products

AllConnect (discontinued)
AllConnect was a mobile app for streaming music, photos and videos from Android and iOS devices to DLNA receivers (smart TVs, set-top-boxes, wireless speakers, etc.). It was launched on November 12, 2013 under the name of Streambels. As of April, 2020, Tuxera discontinued development of the AllConnect technology and removed the Android and iOS apps from their respective stores.

Microsoft NTFS for Mac by Tuxera (formerly Tuxera NTFS for Mac)
Microsoft NTFS for Mac by Tuxera allows macOS computers to read and write NTFS partitions. By default, macOS provides only read access to NTFS partitions. The latest stable version of the driver is 2022, including support for Apple silicon, Intel and PowerPC Macs. Microsoft NTFS for Mac by Tuxera is bundled together with Tuxera Disk Manager to facilitate the format and maintenance of NTFS volumes in macOS. The software supports NTFS extended attributes and works with virtualization and encryption solutions including Parallels Desktop and VMware Fusion.

SD Memory Card Formatter
Tuxera, in association with SD Association, developed the official formatting application for Secure Digital memory cards, which is available as a free download for Windows and macOS.

See also
APFS
NTFS
exFAT
NTFS-3G
FAT

References 

Software companies of Finland